Highway 125 is a 28 km long controlled-access highway located in Nova Scotia's Cape Breton Regional Municipality. The provincial government named it Peacekeepers Way on August 18, 2008. Part of the provincial 100-series arterial highway network, Highway 125 encircles the west side of Sydney Harbour, from an interchange with Highway 105 (the Trans-Canada Highway) at Sydney Mines to Trunk 4 (Grand Lake Road) immediately east of Sydney.

Route description
The northern third of the highway was upgraded during the late 1990s and early 2000s from a two-lane freeway to a twinned 4-lane freeway.  Particularly problematic was the fact that the highway passes in proximity to Pottle Lake, the water supply reservoir for North Sydney, which required installation of pollution control monitoring and containment systems.

In 2002 a connector road was built from the Grand Lake Road interchange which gives access to the port of Sydney at the former Sydney Steel Corporation property which is now an industrial park.

In the fall of 2006, an additional interchange was opened at Coxheath Road, offering direct access to the communities of Coxheath, Blacketts Lake, and the Cantley Village subdivision.

In January 2008, a public meeting was held to discuss the required infrastructure to finally twin Highway 125 from its six lane divided portion in Sydney River to its eastern terminus at Grand Lake Road. The design work and implementation will require the construction of a roundabout at the George Street exit (in addition to the roundabout at the Alexandra Street exit that was completed in December 2009), as well as over-pass structures for George Street, and Cow Bay Road/Upper Prince Street. The Cow Bay Road/Upper Prince Street overpass has now been cancelled, and a round-a-about is being proposed for Exit 9. At-grade intersections will be eliminated, and access roads will be constructed for a DND small arms range between Exits 8 (George Street) and Exit 9 (Grand Lake Road/SPAR), as well as the fresh water reservoir. The project is expected to be completed in 2012.

On December 4, 2010, twinning was completed from Exit 4 near Balls Creek to Exit 5A near Coxheath.

History
The highway was built in the late 1950s - early 1960s and extended from North Sydney to Point Edward, but branched off in Point Edward and continued along Nova Scotia Route 305 then Trunk 5 until Sydney River. When Highway 125 bypassed the Trunk 5 sections of 125 in the late 1960s - early 1970s it became a controlled access highway for a lot of the highway. In 1970 the highway extended to Grand Lake Road bypassing Sydney to Nova Scotia Trunk 4. In the 1990s the highway became twinned from Balls Creek - Upper North Sydney and from the late 1990s- early 2000s it was twinned around North Sydney and waterlines were placed around Pottle Lake. In 2010 the highway was twinned from Point Edward to Sydney River. In 2014 and 2015 the highway was twinned between Sydney River and Grand Lake Road (its eastern terminus).

Kilometres northwest to southeast
0 to 2.7 km
 This section was built in the early 1960s as an uncontrolled access highway
 At Exit 2 Johnston Road; King Street there was an intersection until the early 2000s when it was twinned to a 4 lane freeway
 The speed limit is 100 kilometres per hour (62 mph)

2.7 km to 9 km
 This section was built in the early 1960s as a Super 2 controlled access highway 
 This section was twinned to a 4 lane freeway between the early 1990s until the early 2000s
 The speed limit is 100 kilometres per hour (62 mph)

9 km to 11.6 km
 This section was built in the late 1950s as a Super 2 uncontrolled access highway
 Three intersections were inserted before Exit 3 and 4 were built
 This section was twinned to a 4 lane freeway in the early 1990s
 The speed limit is 100 kilometres per hour (62 mph)

11.6 km to 19.2 km
 This section was built in the late 1960s as a Super 2 controlled Access Highway with the exception of an intersection
 A new interchange at Exit 5A was put in 2006 for connections to Coxheath Road, Blacketts Lake 
 This section was twinned in 2010
 The speed limit is 100 kilometres per hour (62 mph)

19.2 to 28.0 km
 This section was built in the late 1960s as a Super 2 controlled access highway.
 This section was twinned between 2014 and 2015.
A new interchange at Exit 7A was put in 2015 for connections to Membertou.
 It is the busiest section of this highway
 The speed limit is 100 kilometres per hour (62 mph) with the exception of Cow Bay Road and the end of the highway where it is at 80 kilometres per hour (49 mph)

Exit list

References

Nova Scotia provincial highways
Roads in the Cape Breton Regional Municipality
Limited-access roads in Canada